Mohammad Ashfaq Ahmed (born 26 March 1985), commonly shortened as Ashfaq Ahmed or Mohammad Ashfaq, is a Pakistani-born cricketer who played for the United Arab Emirates national cricket team.

In Pakistan
In a Twenty20 match for Lahore Eagles against Rawalpindi Rams, Ashfaq scored 99 runs not out from 58 balls. He reached 99 when Lahore still needed three runs for victory, then Rawalpindi bowler Najaf Shah deliberately bowled a wide ball down the leg side which went for four runs, handing Lahore the victory but preventing Ashfaq from scoring his maiden century. Lahore's team were upset with this act and refused to shake hands with the Rawalpindi players.

In the UAE
He made his List A debut for the United Arab Emirates against Nepal in the 2015–17 ICC World Cricket League Championship on 6 December 2017.

In January 2018, he was named in the United Arab Emirates One Day International (ODI) squad for the tri-series against Ireland and Scotland. He made his ODI debut against Ireland in the tri-series on 11 January 2018. Later the same month, he was named in the United Arab Emirates' squad for the 2018 ICC World Cricket League Division Two tournament.

In August 2018, he was named in the United Arab Emirates' squad for the 2018 Asia Cup Qualifier tournament.

He made his Twenty20 International (T20I) debut for the UAE in a one-off match against Australia on 22 October 2018.

In December 2018, he was named in the United Arab Emirates' team for the 2018 ACC Emerging Teams Asia Cup. He was the leading run-scorer for the United Arab Emirates in the tournament, with 167 runs in three matches.

In September 2019, he was named in the United Arab Emirates' squad for the 2019 ICC T20 World Cup Qualifier tournament in the UAE. Ahead of the tournament, the International Cricket Council (ICC) named him as the player to watch in the UAE's squad. However, on 21 October 2019, he became the fourth UAE cricketer to be suspended by the ICC, following an investigation into corruption. Ahmed had played in the first two matches for the team in the tournament. In September 2020, Ahmed was charged under the ICC's anti-corruption rules, and was suspended from cricket with immediate effect. In July 2021, the ICC banned him from all cricket for eight years, backdated to 13 September 2020.

References

External links
 

1985 births
Living people
Emirati cricketers
United Arab Emirates One Day International cricketers
United Arab Emirates Twenty20 International cricketers
Cricketers from Lahore
Cricketers banned for corruption
Pakistani emigrants to the United Arab Emirates
Pakistani expatriate sportspeople in the United Arab Emirates